Tom Lee Park is a city park located to the immediate west of downtown Memphis, Tennessee, overlooking the Mississippi River. The park is named after Tom Lee, an African-American riverworker, who saved the lives of 32 passengers of the sinking steamboat M.E. Norman in 1925.

Tom Lee Park is a popular location for walkers, joggers, roller bladers and cyclists, and hosts one event per year,  the Beale Street Music Festival that kicks off Memphis in May.

Geography

Luxury homes and condominiums line the top of the bluff overlooking the park and the river.

Sinking of M.E. Norman

The park is named after area resident Tom Lee (1885–1952).

Late during the afternoon of May 8, 1925, Lee steered his  skiff Zev upriver after delivering an official to Helena, Arkansas.

Also on the river was the steamboat , carrying members of the Engineers Club of Memphis, the American Society of Civil Engineers, and their families.

One man rescues 32 lives
Tom Lee witnessed M.E. Norman capsize in the swift current  downriver from Memphis at Cow Island Bend. Although he could not swim, he rescued 32 people with five trips to shore. Lee acted quickly, calmly and with no regard for his own safety, continuing to search after night fell. Because of his efforts, only 23 people died.

Posthumous honors

To honor the hero, the Memphis Engineers Club raised enough money to purchase a house for Lee and his wife.

Tom Lee died of cancer on April 1, 1952 at John Gaston Hospital. Two years after his death, the park along the Memphis Riverfront was named in his honor and a granite obelisk was erected. The obelisk was destroyed once in 2003 in the aftermath of Hurricane Elvis and again during strong storms in May 2017.

In October 2006, a bronze sculpture by artist David Alan Clark  was erected in the park to commemorate the event and to honor the civil hero. The sculpture  depicts the rescue of a survivor saved from drowning in the Mississippi River.

Events held in Tom Lee Park

Among several events held throughout the year, the park is well known throughout the city and region as the site of different outdoor events.

Music
The annual Memphis in May celebration is a high-profile event in the park.

The Beale Street Music Festival is a three-day event during the Memphis in May celebration, hosting over 60 musical acts each year on four stages, in diverse genres such as blues, hip-hop, and metal.

The Sunset Symphony concert, since discontinued, the largest annual performance event of the Memphis Symphony Orchestra, was a highlight in the park during Memorial Day weekend, marking the end of the Memphis in May celebration. It has been replaced with a "Celebrate Memphis" event marking the end of the monthlong affair.

Barbecue Cooking Contest
The World Championship Barbecue Cooking Contest, held the third weekend of May, is the world's largest pork barbecue cooking competition, attracting hundreds of competitors to Tom Lee Park from around the world.

See also
M.E. Norman (steamboat)
Memphis, Tennessee
Memphis in May

References

External links
Memphis River Parks Partnership

Parks in Memphis, Tennessee